The  Head of Kyiv City, unofficially and more commonly the Mayor of Kyiv, is a city official elected by popular vote who serves as a head of the Kyiv city state administration (the capital of Ukraine) and a chairperson the Kyiv City Council.

The mayor is elected for the term of four years. Current mayor Vitali Klitschko was sworn in on 5 June 2014. Klitschko was last reelected in the 2020 Kyiv local election with 50.52% of the votes, in the first round of the election.

Elections of mayor of Kyiv
In March 1990, Kyiv's "First Truly Democratic" elections were announced (see Demokratizatsiya, part of Soviet Perestroika). Dmytro Tabachnyk (ran as the Communist party candidate) and Mikhail Pogrebinsky (ran as an unaffiliated candidate) in an interview with Segodnya claimed that they were truly the most honest elections. The elections took place alongside the 1990 Ukrainian Supreme Soviet election.

Following the political crisis of 1993–94, snap elections were held for to elect the country's president and parliament, as well as local elections.

In 2006, according to the Kyiv City Electoral Commission, Leonid Chernovetskyi won 31.83% of the popular vote, Vitali Klitschko placed second with 23.7%, and incumbent Oleksandr Omelchenko placed third with 21.2%.

As of December 2006, Chernovetskyi's rating had decreased to 8%. This was mostly due to his betrayal of those who elected him, most notably through his increasing of the price of household services (such as water and gas) by 340%.

However, Chernovetskyi won a second term as Mayor of Kyiv with 38% of the vote in the 25 May 2008 snap local election, called by the Verkhovna Rada in March. From the resignation of Chernovetskyi in July 2012 until fresh elections in 2014, Kyiv City Council Secretary and Deputy Mayor Halyna Hereha was the acting Mayor of Kyiv.

In the 2014 Kyiv local election, Vitali Klitschko was elected as mayor of Kyiv with almost 57% of the votes. Klitschko was sworn in as mayor on 5 June 2014.

The 2015 Kyiv local election (including mayoral elections) took place on 25 October 2015. A second round of mayoral elections was held on 15 November 2015 between Klitschko and Boryslav Bereza after incumbent Mayor Klitschko scored 40.5% of the vote and Bereza 8.8% in the first round. Klitschko won the second round with 66.5%; Bereza gained 33.51% of the votes.

The 2020 Kyiv local election (including mayoral elections) took place on 25 October 2020. Incumbent Mayor Klitschko won the election with 50.52% of the votes, in the first round of the election. None of the other candidates had more than 10% of the vote.

Dualism of authority in Kyiv
An October 2010 Presidential decree relieved then-mayor of Kyiv Leonid Chernovetskyi of the office of Head of Kyiv City Administration, while still preserving the post of mayor. This led to Chernovetskyi being deprived of his official decision-making role and most power in the capital was handed over to the Head of Kyiv City Administration. At the time that was Oleksandr Popov, who was appointed by President Viktor Yanukovych on 16 November 2010. Before these amendments, the elected mayor of the Kyiv City Council was automatically appointed also as head of the Kyiv City Administration.

Chernovetskyi was not seen in Kyiv for several months after Popov's appointment, but returned to the public eye in early 2011. By that time, Chernovetskyi had become extremely unpopular among the residents of Kyiv.

Chernovetskyi tendered his resignation on 1 June 2012. The City Council decided on 12 July 2012 that Halyna Hereha would temporarily act as the mayor of the capital city. A petition to the Ukrainian Parliament on holding an early mayoral election in the city was sent (the dates of the early mayoral elections are set by Ukraine's parliament). New elections were held in 2014; Vitali Klitschko was elected as mayor of Kyiv with almost 57% of the votes.

Since 25 June 2014 the post of mayor of Kyiv and Head of Kyiv City Administration have been held by a single person again. This person is Vitali Klitschko, who was sworn in as mayor on 5 June 2014 and who was appointed Head of Kyiv City Administration by Ukrainian President Petro Poroshenko on 25 June 2014.

Head of Kyiv City (Mayor of Kyiv) 
 1997–1998: Leonid Kosakivsky
 1999–2006: Oleksandr Omelchenko
 2006–2012: Leonid Chernovetskyi
 2012–2014: Halyna Hereha (acting)
 2014–present: Vitali Klitschko

Chairperson the Kyiv City Council (1990–1999) 
 1990: Arnold Nazarchuk
 1990–1991: Hryhoriy Malyshevsky
 1991–1992: Oleksandr Mosyuk (acting)
 1992–1994: Vasyl Nesterenko
 1994–1997: Leonid Kosakivsky
 1998–1999: Oleksandr Omelchenko

Previous posts

 1500 – 1835 Vogt of the city of Kyiv, official title was "Vijt" which is an adaptation of the Polish "Wojt"
 Vogt was in charge of city magistrate. After the partition of Poland the post was transformed and magistrate became a city court. In 1831 the Magdeburg town rights were abolished in the Russian Empire, except for Kyiv where it was discontinued in 1835 following a transitional period that began in 1781.
 1835 – 1919 Head of the city of Kyiv (Russian Empire)
 1919 – 1941 Chairperson of the Kyiv Council (Soviet Union)
 1941 – 1943 Burgomaster (Nazi Germany)
 1990 – 1999 Chairperson of the Kyiv Council
 1999 – present Head of the city of Kyiv

See also
 Kyiv City State Administration
 Kyiv City Council
 Timeline of Kyiv

References

External links 

 

Mayors of Kyiv
Kyiv Mayors
 
Kyiv